John David "Jerry" Spillane  (1909–1985) was a Welsh neurologist and a pioneer of tropical neurology.

Biography
After education at Howardian High School and then graduation BSc from University College Cardiff, Spillane studied medicine at Cardiff's Welsh National School of Medicine, graduating there MB BCh (Wales) in 1933. He qualified MRCP in 1936. In 1937 he went to the USA as a Commonwealth Fund fellow, studying under Paul Dudley White at Harvard Medical School and Massachusetts General Hospital. In 1938 Spillane was awarded a Harvard research fellowship and studied at the Neurological Institute of New York affiliated with Columbia University College of Physicians and Surgeons. In 1939 he returned to the UK and graduated MD (Wales) with a thesis based on his research in cardiology.

In 1939 in East Glamorgan, Glamorganshire, he married Joan Rees, daughter of a Cardiganshire physician. Spillane then enlisted in the RAMC and was posted to the military hospital at Aldershot. He was subsequently posted to the Middle East as an adviser in neurology to the Ninth Army. He completed his war service as lieutenant colonel and adviser in neurology to Middle East Forces. After the end of WWII he spent a year at the National Hospital for Neurology and Neurosurgery, Queen Square, London. He was appointed in 1946 an assistant physician to the Cardiff Royal Infirmary and then a consultant neurologist there, as well as an honorary lecturer at the Welsh National School of Medicine. His clinical research, teaching, and writing helped to establish an international reputation for the Cardiff Royal Infirmary's department of neurology. He gave weekly clinical demonstrations known as the "JD Show".

Spillane was elected FRCP in 1950. In the 1960s he was one of the first to use carbamazepine for the treatment of trigeminal neuralgia. In 1968 he published An Atlas of Clinical Neurology, with in 1975 a second edition and in 1982 a third edition, which was revised by his son, John, who was also a consultant neurologist. The Atlas was translated into four languages. In 1972 J. D. Spillane delivered the Bradshaw Lecture on The geography of neurology. In 1974 he retired and was elected president of the Association of British Neurologists. Under the auspices of the Royal Society of Medicine he gave in 1976 the Hughlings Jackson lecture on Hughlings Jackson's American contemporaries: the birth of American neurology. For the academic year 1976–1977 he was Sandoz visiting professor at the Dartmouth Medical School in New Hampshire.

Upon his death he was survived by his widow, his son, and two daughters.

Selected publications

Articles
with Paul D. White: 

with Paul White: 

with J. W. Keyser, and R. A. Parker: 

with H. Urich:

Books

as editor:  (This was the first textbook specifically dealing with the subspecialty of tropical neurology within tropical medicine.)

References

 

1909 births
1985 deaths
Medical doctors from Cardiff
British neurologists
20th-century Welsh medical doctors
Alumni of Cardiff University
Fellows of the Royal College of Physicians
Royal Army Medical Corps officers